The 1923 Oklahoma Sooners football team represented the University of Oklahoma in the 1923 college football season. In their 19th year under head coach Bennie Owen, the Sooners compiled a 3–5 record (2–4 against conference opponents), finished in seventh place in the Missouri Valley Conference, and outscored their opponents by a combined total of 144 to 111.

No Sooners were recognized as All-Americans, and end King Price was the only Sooner to receive all-conference honors.

Schedule

References

Oklahoma
Oklahoma Sooners football seasons
Oklahoma Sooners football